Arthur Anthony Rebel (March 4, 1914 – July 10, 2004) was a professional baseball player.  He was an outfielder over parts of two seasons (1938, 1945) with the Philadelphia Phillies and St. Louis Cardinals.  For his career, he compiled a .333 batting average in 81 at-bats and drove in six runs.  Rebel also played 17 seasons for 18 teams in the minor leagues, hitting .301 with 106 home runs.

He was born in Cincinnati, Ohio and later died in Tampa, Florida at the age of 90.

External links

1914 births
2004 deaths
Philadelphia Phillies players
St. Louis Cardinals players
Major League Baseball outfielders
Baseball players from Ohio
Bartlesville Bucs players
York White Roses players
Trenton Senators players
Anniston Rams players
Nashville Vols players
Augusta Tigers players
Fort Worth Cats players
Montgomery Rebels players
St. Paul Saints (AA) players
Louisville Colonels (minor league) players
Knoxville Smokies players
Mobile Bears players
Columbus Red Birds players
Rochester Red Wings players
Birmingham Barons players
Tampa Smokers players
St. Petersburg Saints players
Lafayette Bulls players